The Secretary of State for the Environment was a UK cabinet position, responsible for the Department of the Environment (DoE). This was created by Edward Heath as a combination of the Ministry of Housing and Local Government, the Ministry of Transport and the Ministry of Public Building and Works on 15 October 1970. Thus it managed a mixed portfolio of issues: housing and planning, local government, public buildings, environmental protection and, initially, transport – James Callaghan gave transport its own department again in 1976. It has been asserted that during the Thatcher government the DoE led the drive towards centralism, and the undermining of local government. Particularly, the concept of 'inner cities policy', often involving centrally negotiated public-private partnerships and centrally appointed development corporations, which moved control of many urban areas to the centre, and away from their, often left-wing, local authorities. The department was based in Marsham Towers, three separate tower blocks built for the separate pre-merger ministries, in Westminster.

In 1997, when Labour came to power, the DoE was merged with the Department of Transport to form the Department of the Environment, Transport and the Regions (DETR), thus, essentially, restoring the DoE to its initial 1970 portfolio. The titular mention of 'the Regions' referred to the government's pledge to create regional government. In the wake of the 2001 foot and mouth crisis, the environmental protection elements of the DETR were split of and merged with the Ministry of Agriculture, Fisheries and Food (MAFF), to form the Department for Environment, Food and Rural Affairs (Defra). Meanwhile, the transport, housing and planning, and local and regional government aspects went to a new Department for Transport, Local Government and the Regions (DTLR). A year later the DTLR also split, with transport getting its own department and the rest going to the Office of the Deputy Prime Minister.

List of Environment Secretaries

References

Environment
1970 establishments in the United Kingdom
1997 disestablishments in the United Kingdom